Lusaghbyur is a town in the Spitak Municipality within the Lori Province of Armenia.

Etymology 
The village was previously known as Aghbulagh.

History 
During the Turkish–Armenian War in late 1920, The Turkish army massacred 1,186 inhabitants of the village.

Demographics
The population of the village since 1831 is as follows:

References

Populated places in Lori Province